Brian Niedermeyer (born December 28, 1988) is an American football coach and former player. He most recently served as the linebackers coach at Tennessee.

Early life and playing career 
Niedermeyer was born in Eagle River, Alaska and went to Chugiak High School. He earned all-state in football and basketball at Chugiak before going on to play tight end at University of Arkansas at Pine Bluff.

Assistant coaching career 
Niedermeyer began his coaching career in 2012 as a student assistant University of Arkansas at Pine Bluff, studying defense. The following year he took on a volunteer analyst role under linebackers coach Michael Barrow for the Miami Hurricanes football program.

In 2014, Niedermeyer started his first positions coaching role in his career for East Texas Baptist University, coaching the wide receiver group. He coached the group to becoming the top passing offense in NCAA Division III that year.

In 2015, Niedermeyer joined the University of Georgia football program as graduate assistant. There he worked predominantly with the linebackers group, helping coach and develop Leonard Floyd, Jordan Jenkins, and Roquan Smith. Niedermeyer would then join the University of Alabama football program, again as a graduate assistant. He worked under then defensive coordinator Jeremy Pruitt, who would eventually become the head coach of the University of Tennessee Volunteers. Niedermeyer got promoted to assistant director of recruiting operations in 2017, while also helping coach and develop future professional players Reuben Foster, Tim Williams, and Ryan Anderson.

In December 2017, Pruitt was hired as the head coach of the University of Tennessee Volunteers football program. He hired Niedermeyer as the tight ends coach for the Vols. Niedermeyer quickly went to work recruiting and signing the then nation's No.1 tight end from Junior College, Dominic Wood-Anderson. Niedermeyer continued his recruiting momentum for the 2018-2019 season by signing multiple top players in the class including Darnell Wright, Quavaris Crouch, and Henry To'oto'o. His efforts earned him the 2019 National Recruiter of the Year by sports media outlets 247Sports.com and ESPN.

In January 2021, Niedermeyer was fired for cause along with most of the coaching staff at the University of Tennessee after an internal investigation. Brian Niedermeyer was one of only two assistants coaches who had been with Tennessee football since Jeremy Pruitt was hired.  There were allegations that coaches put money into McDonald's bags and gave them to the recruits when they came on campus.

Coaching awards 
In 2019, Niedermeyer was named college football's National Recruiter of the Year by 247Sports.com and ESPN.

References

External links

1988 births
Living people
Players of American football from Anchorage, Alaska
American football tight ends
Coaches of American football from Alaska
Arkansas–Pine Bluff Golden Lions football coaches
Miami Hurricanes football coaches
East Texas Baptist Tigers football coaches
Georgia Bulldogs football coaches
Alabama Crimson Tide football coaches
Tennessee Volunteers football coaches